The Potrillo volcanic field is a monogenetic volcanic field located on the Rio Grande Rift in southern New Mexico, United States and northern Chihuahua, Mexico.

Volcanology 

It is a monogenetic volcanic field that can be divided in three volcanic regions. The central Aden–Afton field has a number of young flows, three cinder cones and three maar volcanoes, including Kilbourne Hole. The easternmost Black Mountain-Sao Thomas alignment is a north-south belt of vents near the Rio Grande that includes Santo Tomas, San Miguel, Little Clack Mountain and Black Mountain. The field consists almost entirely of alkaline olivine basalt.

Most of the eastern area vents are scoria cones, some of which have breach flows with pahoehoe surface. Lavas of Black Mountain have been dated as 69 to 85 thousand years old. When performing 3He surface exposure dating, the upper  of flow surfaces is sufficient enough for collecting samples desired. It is essential to collect samples with primarily display flow features, such as spatter, flow lineation, and cooling rinds.

The central Aden-Afton field includes Aden, Afton, the Gardner cones, and the Kilbourne Hole and Hunt's Hole maars. The two maars erupted through portions of pre-existing Afton series basalt flows. The Afton flows may have erupted through a fissure upon which the Gardner cones were emplaced. Aden is a well-preserved shield volcano that at one time had a lava lake, which later solidified and partially collapsed to the west.  Its lavas have been dated as between 15 and 19 thousand years old.

The western West Potrillo field includes the Western Potrillo Mountains, a cavalcade of hundreds of coalescing cones and flows formed upon older, thick platform that is possibly fissure-fed stacked flows. Also within the western area are the Riley, Malpais, and Potrillo maars. Potrillo maar is included with the western alignment due to its position west of the Robledo fault. The West Potrillo field is the oldest of the Potrillo volcanic fields, with lavas ranging in age from 262 to 916 thousand years.

The central and eastern parts of the Potrillo volcanic field were erupted onto the La Mesa surface, which formed between 900 and 700 Ka. There is a diversity of rock types beneath the Potrillo volcanics, ranging in age from Proterozoic granites through a Phanerozoic sedimentary succession to basalt-andesite volcanics of the southern fringes of the Sierra de las Uvas volcanic field.

One of the lava tubes of Aden Crater contained a ground sloth skeleton, which has been dated at about 11,000 years old. This is now at Yale's Peabody Museum of Natural History. This ground sloth (Nothrotheriops  shastense) is one of the few specimens of this age which have been found with patches of skin and hair preserved.

The Potrillo volcanic field has two important xenolith localities. These are Kilbourne Hole and Potrillo maar where mantle peridotites, feldspathic granulites and kaersutite occur. Rock samples collected in the northern part of the pyroclastic deposit of the Potrillo maar, and lava associated with a cinder cone yielded potassium–argon ages of approximately 1.29 and 1.18 million years.

Structural geology 

The Potrillo volcanic field is part of the southern Rio Grande rift and illustrates the Cenozoic tectonic evolution of that structure. The tectonic history of the area is recorded in the East Potrillo Mountains, a late Tertiary west-tilted horst located in the southern part of the central area. This range exposes rocks of Permian to middle Miocene age and shows three significant deformation events:

 Laramide thrust faulting to the northeast during the Late Cretaceous = Early Cenozoic. Erosion has not exposed enough of the Laramide structures to determine whether this was thin-skinned overthrusting or deep faulting and uplift of basement blocks.
 Middle to late Tertiary rotation of fault blocks due to either northeast or north-south extension (in the Rio Grande Rift). The system of low angle normal faults that resulted were closely spaced and consequently cut the Laramide structures. The extensional tectonics continued throughout the Middle Cenozoic.
 Late Cenozoic tectonic uplift as a result of movement on high angle normal faults.

Rift extension took place in an intense 30–20 Ma phase, involving low-angle normal faults, and a less intense post-10 Ma phase, involving high-angle normal faults. Mack and Seager (1995) argued that the Quaternary magmatism in the West Potrillo field reached the surface via a transfer zone linking two adjacent N–S-trending, long-lived, extensional structures—the West Robledo and Camel Mountain faults.

Cosmogenic isotope dating

Cosmogenic isotopes are rare isotopes created when a high-energy cosmic ray interacts with the nucleus of an atom. These isotopes are produced within earth materials such as rocks or soil, in Earth's atmosphere, and in extraterrestrial items such as meteorites. Cosmogenic 3He surface dating determines the age of lava flows by measuring the accumulation of cosmogenic 3He since a flow crystallized. It is a technique that is optimal when working with well preserved young surface lavas (<700 ka). Cosmogenic 3He/21Ne is also measured as a check that 3He has been retained by the samples taken.

Cinder cone morphology 

The current morphology of the Potrillo volcanic field consists of over 100 cinder cones, ranging in age from 1 million to 20,000 years old. Slope angles of young cinder cones subject to mechanical weathering in an arid environment show a relationship with age. The cones of the Potrillo volcanic field have been used to calibrate the age-slope angle relationship by comparison of 3He and 40Ar/39Ar ages to slope angles obtained from overlapping DRG digital elevation models and digital topographic maps DEM.

There are 3 groups of slope angles;
 Group 1: age of around 250 Ka years old.
 Group 2: age of around 125 Ka years old.
 Group 3: age of around 60 Ka years old.

The new morphologic dating methods suggest that cinder cone formation in the Potrillo volcanic field may have occurred at different intervals and that the field may be currently developing new cinder cones.

Xenoliths
Kilbourne Hole is notable for the abundance of xenoliths in the crater ejecta. These are fragments of country rock carried intact to the surface by the eruption. Xenoliths at Kilbourne Hole include both upper mantle rocks and lower crustal rocks and are most abundant in the northern and eastern rim. Because these are samples of portions of the Earth that are inaccessible by mining or drilling, they are of great scientific interest.

Most of the mantle xenoliths at Kilbourne Hole are composed of lherzolite, a rock composed mostly of olivine and pyroxene. The olivine has a distinctive pale green color in which the pyroxene forms black flecks. Peridotite is occasionally found here as well. 

The peridotites range in texture from fine-grained equigranular through porphyroclastic to protogranular. The more fine-grained peridotites are also more fertile, and some approximate the model composition for primitive mantle. Clinopyroxenite is found as veins or dikes, particularly within the more fine-grained peridotite. Equilibration temperatures range from  The xenoliths have P-wave velocities of 7.75 to 7.89 km/s, consistent with P-wave velocies in the Rio Grande rift of 7.6 to 7.8 km/s

Deep crustal rocks include a variety of granulites of both high-silica (felsic) and low-silica (mafic) compositions. These likely took less than three days to reach the surface from their place of origin, and show pristine composition and texture. Their characteristics show that they were little altered from their formation 1.6 to 1.8 billion years ago, other than some reheating during the opening of the Rio Grande rift. Middle crustal xenoliths are Oligocene (26–27 Ma) in age and suggest a large unexposed batholith underlying the volcanic field. Metagabbro and amphibolite are notable scarce in the lower crustal xenoliths, suggesting that underplating has not taken place in this part of the rift.

Xenoliths are almost entirely absent in the ejecta from Hunt's Hole, but xenoliths are found in Potrillo maar to the south.

Geophysics 
Seismic velocity data, including reflected and refracted arrivals, shows that the upper 5 km of the crust beneath the Portillo volcanic field (PVF) is characterized by alternating regions of low and high velocities of 2.5-3.7 km/s and 3.5-4.3 km/s, respectively. The velocities increase with depth to approximately 6.0 km/s at 10 km, 6.5 km/s at 16 km, and they increase sharply from 6.9 to 8.0 km/s between 28 and 38 km.

The low crust of the PVF has a uniform density of 2880 kg/m3. The upper to middle crust (between 5 km and 20 km) of the PVF includes a block with a density of 2740 kg/m3. This body is a mid-crustal "welt" and velocities within this region increase to more than 6.35 km/s. This greater density creates a lateral density contrast and in turn generates a long-wavelength gravity high. The upper mantle densities at the PVF decrease from 3280 to 3250 kg/m3 from west to east, based on a decrease in velocities from approximately 7.96 to 7.70 km/s.

Coyote Hill and the West Portillo mountains make up the western portion of the PVF, with regional velocities in this uplift ranging from 4.5 km/s to over 6.0 km/s at a depth of 2.5 km. To the east is the Malpais basin, where velocities range from 1.68 km/s to 4.86 km/s at a depth of approximately 3 km. The Mesilla basin is an asymmetric basin that adjoins the eastern edge of the PVF and extends on to the western flank of the Franklin mountain uplift. At a depth of about 1.5 km the velocities in the western area range from approximately 2.4 km/s to 4.0 km/s at a depth of about 1.5 km.

There is increased seismic reflectivity within the crust and at the Moho interface concentrated below the PVF. The mid-crustal shows reflectivity increases between  offset; mid-crustal reflectivity is present between 4 and 6 seconds, reduced time.

Notable vents

See also
 List of volcanoes in the United States

Notes

Further reading

 
 
 

 
 
 
  Contribution by: Crumpler LS, Aubele JC. Volcanic maar north of Red Hill Maar.
 

Volcanic fields of Arizona
Volcanic fields of New Mexico
Maars of New Mexico
Landforms of Doña Ana County, New Mexico
Landforms of Luna County, New Mexico
Pliocene volcanism
Pleistocene volcanism
Monogenetic volcanic fields
Landforms of Chihuahua (state)
Organ Mountains–Desert Peaks National Monument
Cinder cones of the United States